The city of Chicago is located in northern Illinois, United States, at the south western tip of Lake Michigan. It sits on the Saint Lawrence Seaway continental divide at the site of the Chicago Portage, an ancient trade route connecting the Mississippi River and the Great Lakes watersheds.

Geography

Chicago's present natural geography is a result of the large glaciers of the Ice Age, namely the Wisconsinan Glaciation that carved out the modern basin of Lake Michigan (which formed from the glacier's meltwater). The city of Chicago itself sits on the Chicago Plain, a flat plain that was once the bottom of ancestral Lake Chicago. This plain has very little topographical relief; in fact, topographical relief is so unusual in the plain that what would be unnoticed hills and ridges in other locales have been given names. In pioneer days, this hill was called Blue Island, so named because at a distance it looked like an island set in a trackless prairie sea. In fact, it and the nearby Stony Island were both islands in Lake Chicago as it receded. On the North side, the diagonals Clark Street and Ridge Boulevard run along ridges that were once sandbars in the Lake.

One special feature of the Chicago area was the now-vanished Mud Lake in the Des Plaines River watershed. During heavy periods of rain or when the Des Plaines overflowed its banks due to downstream ice dams in the early spring, the river would flow through Mud Lake to the South Branch of the Chicago River, forming a favorite portage for early traders and creating the path of the future I&M and Chicago Sanitary and Ship Canals. When the city we know today was initially founded in the 1830s, the land was swampy and most of the early building began on low dunes around the Chicago River's mouth.  Indeed, Chicago's low lying geography, which ultimately became crucial to its boom town development (as the site of the Chicago Portage and canal), could not initially attract substantial early settlement because the tall grass prairie around its lake and river systems was underlain by hard packed glacial clay, making much of the area forbidding wetlands.  Thus, the paradox of Chicago's development as a city in the 19th century became taking advantage of this geography, but also overcoming its limitations.

North of the city of Chicago, there are steep bluffs and ravines that run along Lake Michigan. In contrast, south of the city of Chicago into Northwest Indiana it is without bluffs, but instead has sand dunes. The greatest example of these can be seen at Indiana Dunes National Park, where some dunes reach up to almost 200 feet. Farther inland, a series of moraines surrounds the Chicago Plain. This surrounding area is hilly and higher than the Chicago Plain. Past the moraines, the land flattens out again, but is interspersed with a few deep river valleys such as the Illinois River, Fox River, Des Plaines River, and Kankakee River. Here you may find rock cliffs and rock ravines, which are absent from the interior Chicago area (the ravines of the north shore and south suburbs are soil ravines without any rock).

Also, a very large limestone quarry (Thornton Quarry) exists just south of the city of Chicago in the suburb of Thornton. It was once a coral reef when the Midwest was covered by a warm inland sea (hundreds of millions of years before the glaciation of the Chicago area). The rest of the Chicago area does not have bedrock this close to the surface.

Climate

The city lies within the humid continental climate zone, and experiences four distinct seasons. Winters are cold, snowy and windy with temperatures below freezing. Spring and fall are mild with moderate humidity. Along with long, hot dry spells in the summer, Chicago can suffer extreme winter cold spells. In the entire month of January 1977, the temperature did not rise above .

Chicago's yearly precipitation averages about 34 inches (860 millimeters). Summer is typically the rainiest season, with short-lived rainfall and thunderstorms more common than prolonged rainy periods. Winter precipitation tends to be more snow than rain. This marked the first time in three decades that back-to-back winters produced 50 inches or more of snow. Average winter snowfall is normally, depending on the reporting location, . The previous record of  had been set on August 14, 1987.

Statistics
The total area is 2.94% water. The city has been built on relatively flat land, the average height of land is 
above sea level. (Before annexations in the 1950s, notably for O'Hare International Airport, references placed the geographical center near 37th and Honore Streets.) Chicago, along with New York City and Los Angeles, California are the three most populous cities of the U.S., yet Chicago is only half the other two cities' individual land areas. Chicago's nickname, "The Windy City," actually acquired from a political op-ed piece, fits the city well as its location on Lake Michigan moderates the climate and often provides a breeze.

The Chicago Metropolitan Statistical Area (MSA) consists of Cook county and five surrounding Illinois counties as well as the Chicago–Gary–Kenosha Combined Statistical Area (CSA) which is made up of nine counties, two of them in northwestern Indiana and one in southeastern Wisconsin.

Cityscape

After building the first ever skyscraper (Home Insurance Building), Chicago has been at the forefront of skyscraper building ever since. Today Chicago can boast to having 2 of the 10 tallest buildings in the United States and 9 of the 100 in the world.

By modern standards, Chicago has little reason to build up: being located in the Midwest, it has plenty of room to sprawl outwards on almost Euclideanesque flat ground. There is the Chicago River, which may bring some argument as to geographic restriction, but the impact of which was strongly lessened by the strict adherence to the Chicago grid across the river.

Today, Chicago is going through a massive skyscraper building boom, with projects like 55 East Erie (the tallest residential building in the U.S. outside New York City) and Trump International Hotel (completed in August 2008, it is the second tallest in Chicago and the tallest building built in the U.S. for nearly three decades) breaking ground frequently. This can be attributed to the precedent that Chicago has always had a history of frantic skyscraper building, mostly beginning after the Great Chicago Fire when the price of land in the city increased dramatically. This caused architects to start building upward. Since this time developers simply follow the pattern set before them.

Ecology
Chicago lies between the Temperate deciduous forest and Temperate grassland zone (specifically Central forest–grasslands transition, which traditionally feature tall grass prairie). Trees native to the area, which are all deciduous, include:

Acer negundo
Acer rubrum
Acer saccharinum
Betula papyrifera
Celtis occidentalis
Fagus grandifolia
Fraxinus pennsylvanica
Juglans nigra
Ostrya virginiana
Quercus imbricaria
Platanus occidentalis
Populus tremuloides
Sassafras albidum
Tilia americana
Ulmus americana
Viburnum lentago

See also
Chicago River
Chicago Sanitary and Ship Canal
I&M Canal
Lake Michigan

Notes

References

 
Chicago